The 1992 Campeonato Nacional, known as Campeonato Nacional Copa Banco del Estado 1992 for sponsorship purposes, was the 60th season of top-flight football in Chile. Cobreloa won fifth title following a 3–2 home win against Fernández Vial on 13 December. Universidad Católica also qualified for the next Copa Libertadores as Liguilla winners.

Final table

Results

Topscorers

Liguilla Pre-Copa Libertadores

Preliminary round 

* Qualified as "Best Loser"

Liguilla play-off match

Universidad Católica also qualified for the 1993 Copa Libertadores

Promotion/relegation Liguilla

Everton and Deportes Melipilla play in the 1993 Primera División season

See also
1992 Copa Chile

Notes

References
RSSSF Page

Primera División de Chile seasons
Chile
1992 in Chilean football